Katherine Briana "Khat" Bell (born May 5, 1993) is an American volleyball player who played for the Petron Blaze Spikers in the Philippine Super Liga from 2018 to 2020. She currently plays for Korea Expressway Corporation Hi-Pass in the Korean V-League.

Early life
Bell was born on March 5, 1993, to Kenneth Bell and Regina Williams. She was born in San Diego, California, though she considers Mesquite, Texas, as her hometown. She has two sisters and a brother.

Career

College
Bell during her attendance at the University of Texas played for the Texas Longhorns women's volleyball team in the NCAA. During her stint, she was named into the All-American women's volleyball thrice. She along with teammate Haley Eckerman became the first senior class to win all four Big 12 Champions for the Longhorns and advanced to three NCAA Semifinal in four years. In 2012, they help the Longhorns earn their first National Championship since 1988. Also for the year 2012, she was named Cobra Magazine National Defensive Player of the Year. She finished fourth in the University of Texas' career chart with the record of 1.17 blocks per set. She graduated from the university in 2015.

Club
After graduating from the University of Texas, Bell started her club career in South Korea with GS Caltex Seoul. She played for the Korean club from 2015 to 2016 before playing for Gigantes de Carolina in Puerto Rico in 2016. Bell later played for Turkish clubs Manisa BB SK (2016–2017) and Balıkesir Büyükşehir Belediyespor (2017–2018). Two weeks before her stint with Balıkesir was set to end, Bell was contacted by the Petron Blaze Spikers of the Philippine Super Liga (PSL) due to its import player Hillary Hurley having recurring injuries. Bell replaced Hurley as Petron entered the semifinals of the 2018 PSL Grand Prix Conference. On May 1, 2018, Bell scored 42 points for Petron which is the PSL's 2nd highest record for points.

Galatasaray
She signed a 1-year contract with Galatasaray on September 22, 2022.

On 29 December 2022, she announced on her social media account that she had parted ways with Galatasaray.

International
Bell was part of the United States U18 girls' youth team that played at the 2009 FIVB Volleyball Girls' U18 World Championship in Thailand. She was also a participant of the 2015 Summer Universiade in South Korea playing for the Universiade volleyball team of the United States.

Television
Bell was a contestant on the second season of the American TV series The Circle.

Sporting Achievements

Individual
Korean V-League:
 Best Blocker
Philippine Superliga:
 Best Outside Spiker (2019 PSL Grand Prix Conference)

Team
Philippine Superliga:
 Champions - Petron Blaze Spikers (2018 PSL Grand Prix Conference, 2019 PSL Grand Prix Conference)

References

1993 births
Living people
University of Texas alumni
American women's volleyball players
American expatriate sportspeople in the Philippines
American expatriate sportspeople in South Korea
American expatriate sportspeople in Turkey
Sportspeople from Texas
Expatriate volleyball players in the Philippines
Wing spikers
American expatriate volleyball players
GS Caltex Seoul KIXX players
Participants in American reality television series
21st-century American women
Texas Longhorns women's volleyball players
Galatasaray S.K. (women's volleyball) players